Budhasing is a village development committee in Nuwakot District in the Bagmati Zone of central Nepal. At the time of the 1991 Nepal census the area it represented had a population of 3113 living in 575 individual households.

References

External links
UN map of the municipalities of Nuwakot District

Populated places in Nuwakot District